Indrajeet Patel may refer to:

Indrajeet Patel (politician) (1945–2018), Indian politician and representative for Madhya Pradesh
Indrajeet Patel (runner) (born 1994), Indian distance runner